Nyarko is a West African surname most common in Ghana, with a distribution of approximately one person named Nyarko per 330 Ghanaians. Notable people with the surname include:

Alex Nyarko (born 1973), Ghanaian footballer
Kobina Nyarko (born 1972), Ghanaian artist
Martin Osei Nyarko (born 1985), Ghanaian footballer
Patrick Nyarko (born 1986), Ghanaian footballer
Richard Nyarko (born 1984), Ghanaian footballer

References

Surnames of Akan origin